Charles Romeyn may refer to:

 Charles W. Romeyn (died 1942), American architect
 Charles Romeyn (American football) (1874–1950), American football player and U.S. Army officer